Old Fort Church is an historic African-American Methodist church located on Old Baltimore Pike in Christiana, New Castle County, Delaware. The church was originally built on Schoolbell Road (in Christiana Hundred) near Christiana in 1850.  In 1897, it was dismantled and reconstructed on its present site.  It is a one-story, three bay by three bay, gable-roofed brick structure. It features modified lancet-type windows that illuminate the main block.  The gable ends have various types of decorative wood shingles painted dark green.

It was added to the National Register of Historic Places in 1983.

Gallery

References

External links
Historical Marker Data Base entry

African-American history of Delaware
Methodist churches in Delaware
Churches on the National Register of Historic Places in Delaware
Churches completed in 1897
19th-century Methodist church buildings in the United States
Churches in New Castle County, Delaware
National Register of Historic Places in New Castle County, Delaware